Darryll Sulindro-Yang (alt name: Adrian Darryll Sulindro, born 26 October 1987 in Los Angeles, California) is an American figure skater who competed for Taiwan in both singles and pairs. In pairs, he competed with sister Amanda Sunyoto-Yang. They are the five-time Taiwanese national champions. Darryll Sulindro-Yang is a Physical Medicine and Rehabilitation and Interventional Pain Management physician. He obtained his residency training at Icahn School of Medicine at Mount Sinai in New York City , his fellowship training in Interventional Pain Management at the University of California, Irvine and is Currently a practicing Pain Management physician in Los Angeles.

Results 
(with Amanda Sunyoto-Yang)

Programs 
(with Amanda Sunyoto-Yang)

References

External links
 
 

American male pair skaters
American male single skaters
Taiwanese male pair skaters
Taiwanese male single skaters
Living people
1987 births
Figure skaters from Los Angeles
American sportspeople of Taiwanese descent